Galatella sedifolia, often known by the synonym Aster sedifolius, is herbaceous perennial plant belonging to the genus Galatella of the family Asteraceae.

Description
The flowers are lavender-blue or pinkish-lilac, with five to ten petals and a quite protruding yellow centre. Leaves are small, elongated and untoothed. The period of flowering is from July until late autumn.

References

 Flora Europaea

External links
 Biolib
 Aster

Astereae
Flora of Italy
Plants described in 1753
Taxa named by Carl Linnaeus